Qingyuan is a town in northern Guangxi, Southern China.

References

Towns of Hechi